The red-mantled rosefinch (Carpodacus rhodochlamys) is a species of finch in the family Fringillidae.
It is found in Afghanistan, China, India, Iran, Kazakhstan, Mongolia, Pakistan, Russia, and Tajikistan.
Its natural habitats are temperate forest and boreal shrubland.

References

red-mantled rosefinch
Birds of Afghanistan
Birds of Mongolia
Birds of Central Asia
Birds of Western China
Birds of North India
red-mantled rosefinch
Taxonomy articles created by Polbot